The 2009 Slovenian Supercup was a football match that saw the 2008–09 PrvaLiga champions Maribor face off against Slovenian Cup winners Interblock. The match was held on 8 July 2009 at Ljudski vrt in Maribor.

Match details

See also
2008–09 Slovenian PrvaLiga
2008–09 Slovenian Cup

References

Slovenian Supercup
Supercup
Slovenian Supercup 2009
July 2009 sports events in Europe